The Fantaisie in F minor, Op. 49, by Frédéric Chopin is a single-movement work for the piano, composed in 1841, when he was 31 years old. From Chopin's letters it is known that he used the name "fantasy" to show some sort of freedom from rules and give a Romantic expression. Frédéric Chopin continued the tradition of a self-contained movement in his Fantaisie. This Fantaisie is one of Chopin's longest pieces, and is considered one of his greatest works.

Form 
This work belongs to the Fantasy form, a composition free in form and inspiration. It begins with a solemn marching theme that eventually plunges into a passionate and virtuosic section, the transition marked poco a poco … doppio movimento, still with elements of marching, but more triumphant and positive in mood. About halfway through the piece occurs a slow and sombre chorale-like section in B major, before the previous section is restated. After a short, quiet and sweet statement followed by a final flourish the work ends in a plagal cadence in A-flat major, the relative key. This piece is 11–14 minutes long.

References

External links

 
 Performance of Fantaisie in F minor by Cecile Licad from the Isabella Stewart Gardner Museum in MP3 format

Compositions by Frédéric Chopin
Compositions for solo piano
1841 compositions
Chopin
Compositions in F minor